J. Burrows was an Australian cricketer. He played one first-class match for New South Wales in 1877/78.

See also
 List of New South Wales representative cricketers

References

External links
 

Year of birth missing
Year of death missing
Australian cricketers
New South Wales cricketers
Place of birth missing